General elections were held in Liechtenstein in April 1869. Six of the seats in the Landtag were indirectly elected by electors selected by voters.

Electors 
Electors were selected through elections that were held on 18 and 19 April. Each municipality had two electors for every 100 inhabitants.

Results
The electors met on 29 April in Vaduz to elect six Landtag members and five substitute members. The Landtag members and their substitutes were elected in three ballots. Of the 158 electors, 152 participated in the voting.

References 

Liechtenstein
1869 in Liechtenstein
Elections in Liechtenstein
April 1869 events